The 2006 FIRS Intercontinental Cup was the ninth edition of the roller hockey tournament known as the Intercontinental Cup, played on April 1, 2006 at Alcoy, Spain. This edition rolled back to a one-legged final again. FC Barcelona won the cup, defeating Olimpia PC.

Match

See also
FIRS Intercontinental Cup

References

2006 in Spanish sport
International roller hockey competitions hosted by Spain
FIRS Intercontinental Cup
2006 in roller hockey